Kevin Daniel Arbouet is an American director, writer and producer. He was born May 29, 1977, in Brooklyn, New York. He and his partner Larry Strong directed the viral video I Got a Crush... on Obama.

Filmography
 2022 : Showrunner, True Love - Wondery/Amazon
 2006 : An  Guide to Kicking Terrorism's Ass! by Amanda Baramki and Yori Tondrowski : Producer
 2007 : Serial with Larry Strong : Co-director, Screenplay
 2007 : I Believe in America by Michael J. Narvaez : Co-Producer
 2008 : Last Day of Summer by Vlad Yudin : Producer
 2014 : Police State (2016 film) by Kevin Arbouet : Director
 2016 : Fair Market Value by Kevin Arbouet : Director, Screenplay

Television
 2008 : Strokes : Co-director and Co-Producer with Larry Strong

References

http://www.ksla.com/2018/09/23/louisiana-film-prize-announces-s-judges-panels/

https://www.moviemaker.com/archives/festivals/bentonville-film-festival-2018/

https://www.screendaily.com/news/arbouet-to-direct-big-screen-benjamin-dove/5106308.article

http://www.playbill.com/article/join-this-free-happy-hour-dance-workout-with-broadway-performers

https://www.huffingtonpost.com/entry/geena-davis-bentonville-film-festival-celebrates_us_590106d4e4b0768c2682e280

https://www.dallasnews.com/life/better-living/2012/08/21/local-bodybuilder-grows-muscle-and-fame-heads-to-mr-olympia-competition

https://www.billboard.com/articles/news/7784742/garjana-dance-nonprofit-food-tank

https://deadline.com/2013/10/deadline-caption-contest-clooney-photo-bombs-spielberg-and-seinfeld-604433/

External links
 

1977 births
Living people
Writers from Brooklyn
Film directors from New York City
Film producers from New York (state)
Television personalities from New York City